This is a list of Melbourne Victory FC W-League players both past and present.

A
 Laura Alleway
 Rachel Alonso
 Meghan Archer

B
 Melissa Barbieri
 Lauren Barnes
 Enza Barilla
 Louisa Bisby
 Ashley Brown

C
 Stephanie Catley
 Georgia Cloepfil

D
 Brianna Davey
 Lisa De Vanna
 Daniela Digiammarco
 Cassandra Dimovski

E
 Tiffany Eliadis

F
 Jessica Fishlock
 Kendall Fletcher
 Alisha Foote
 Caitlin Friend

G
 Katrina Gorry
 Sarah Groenewald

H
 Monnique Hansen Kofoed
 Sophie Hogben
 Ursula Hughson
 Emily Hulbert
 Jessica Humble

J
 Amy Jackson
 Danielle Johnson

K
 Tal Karp
 Gulcan Koca
 Georgie Koutrouvelis
 Selin Kuralay

L
 Petra Larsson

M

 Melissa Maizels
 Rita Mankowska
 Bethany Mason-Jones
 Ella Mastrantonio
 Jessica McDonald
 Kara Mowbray

N
 Christine Nairn
 Deanna Niceski
 Bronwyn Nutley

O
 Marlies Oostdam

P
 Vedrana Popovic

R
 Sarah Richardson
 Maika Ruyter-Hooley

S
 Julianne Sitch
 Laura Spiranovic
 Rebekah Stott

T
 Stephanie Tanti
 Jodie Taylor
 Rebecca Tegg
 Katie Thorlakson
 Brittany Timko

V
 Snez Veljanovska
 Jacqueline Vogt

 Women
Lists of soccer players by club in Australia
Melbourne sport-related lists
Association football player non-biographical articles